The Mills at Jersey Gardens, originally and also still colloquially called Jersey Gardens, is a two-level indoor outlet mall in Elizabeth, New Jersey. The mall opened on October 21, 1999, and is the largest outlet mall in New Jersey, and much closer to New York City than its largest outlet mall competitor, Woodbury Common.

The mall was developed by Glimcher Realty Trust and owned and managed by Glimcher until January 2015, when it was sold to Simon Property Group as part of an acquisition of Glimcher by Simon's spinoff Washington Prime Group. Simon owns and manages much of Jersey Gardens' outlet mall competition in the area, including Woodbury Common, and has integrated Jersey Gardens into its "Mills" outlet mall portfolio by renaming it "The Mills at Jersey Gardens".

History
The mall was built on a former landfill, which required remediation prior to the mall development. Plans for the  mall were announced in 1998 by Glimcher Realty Trust, emphasizing the sites proximity to the New Jersey Turnpike and its location in an Urban Enterprise Zone, making purchases eligible for a reduced 3½% (now 3.3125% as of January 1, 2018) sales tax rate, a potent lure for New York City residents paying a sales tax rate over 8%. However, the sales tax on certain items, such as food and drink, have an additional 3% Elizabeth City Franchise Fee.

The outlet mall has a Gross leasable area of 1,292,611 ft², placing it in the top ten among the largest shopping malls in New Jersey. The mall contains 230 stores and restaurants. Bus service is available on the NJ Transit route 111 bus that runs between Jersey Gardens and the Port Authority Bus Terminal in New York City.

A direct exit to the facility was constructed, allowing drivers direct access to the mall from the New Jersey Turnpike without driving through local Elizabeth streets. The developer covered the $130 million cost of bonds for the overpass and ramps through property tax payments.

The mall was featured in "A Loser Presents", the February 16, 2012 episode of the TruTV series Impractical Jokers.

Century 21's Mills at Jersey Gardens location closed by October 5, 2020, after the department store had filed for bankruptcy.

References

External links

 Jersey Gardens
 International Council of Shopping Centers: Jersey Gardens

Shopping malls in New Jersey
Buildings and structures in Elizabeth, New Jersey
Outlet malls in the United States
Shopping malls established in 1999
Simon Property Group
Tourist attractions in Union County, New Jersey
Economy of Elizabeth, New Jersey
Shopping malls in the New York metropolitan area
1999 establishments in New Jersey
Geography of Elizabeth, New Jersey